The Palm TX  (written as "Palm T|X" in official documentation) was a personal digital assistant which was produced by Palm, Inc. It was announced and released as part of Palm's October 2005 product cycle, and was in production until March 2009.

Hardware
Prior to its official announcement, a prototype was photographed with palmOne branding, labeled the "Tungsten XX".

See also
 List of Palm OS devices

References

External links

 Palm TX User Guide (via archive.org)
 PalmInfoCenter Review
 CNet.com Review
 Brighthand Review 
 Palm TX on Porter Electronics (A website where the TX may still be available for purchase.)

computer-related introductions in 2005
Tx
portable media players